Zulfiqar Parkar (born 22 November 1957) is an Indian first-class cricketer who represented Mumbai (then Bombay). He made his first-class debut for Mumbai in the 1977-78 Ranji Trophy on 10 December 1977.

References

External links
 

1957 births
Living people
Indian cricketers
Mumbai cricketers